Deborah Sengl (born 2 January 1974) is an Austrian painter and artist. She attended the University of Applied Arts Vienna and received a diploma in 1997. Sengl is the daughter of the painter Peter Sengl and the artist Susanne Lacombe.

References 

Living people
1974 births
Artists from Vienna
Austrian women painters
Austrian sculptors